Anartia lytrea, or Godart's peacock, is a species of nymphalid butterfly found on Hispaniola and the Swan Islands of Honduras.  It is a rare stray on Cuba. The butterfly has been known to occasionally stray into the lower keys of Florida.

References

External links 
 Protein sequencing
 Anartia lytrea at Markku Savela's Lepidoptera and Some Other Life Forms

Anartia
Insects of Cuba
Insects of the Dominican Republic
Fauna of the Swan Islands
Taxa named by Jean-Baptiste Godart
Butterflies described in 1819
Nymphalidae of South America